MV Spirit of Gosport is a vessel owned by the Gosport Ferry Company Ltd and built by Abels Shipbuilders in Bristol.

History

Spirit of Gosport was built in 2001 to replace Portsmouth Queen on ferry duties. However, the company also wanted to replace Solent Enterprise, which operated cruise duties. The vessel was hardly used for the first few months and both existing ferries were kept in service. In 2003, she finally replaced Solent Enterprise on cruise duties. This continued until 2005, when a brand new vessel was purchased to replace Spirit of Gosport on cruise duties.

Shortly after being awarded the contract for Spirit of Gosport, Abels were awarded a follow-on contract for a second ferry, to be known as Spirit of Portsmouth. However this vessel was only partially constructed when the ferry company cancelled the order, and the unfinished hull remained at Abel's shipyard for many years, before being completed as a medical missionary ferry, the Forth Hope. This ship should not be confused with the subsequent Spirit of Portsmouth that now operates alongside the Spirit of Gosport.

Characteristics

References

External links

Gosport Ferry
Ferries of England
Ships built in Bristol
2001 ships